Joan I (1345–1346), was the ruling suo jure Countess of Dreux in 1345–1346.

She was the only child of Peter, Count of Dreux and Isabeau de Melun, lady of Houdain. Her father died when she was not yet a year old, but she barely survived him, dying less than a year into her reign. Her aunt, Joan, succeeded her.

References

Counts of Dreux
1345 births
1346 deaths
House of Dreux
14th-century women rulers